Procercoid is the first larval stage of some tapeworms, which usually develops inside the body cavity of copepods. Flatworm in this stage is not enclosed in a protective cyst, but is infectious. Procercoids resemble their adult forms in pathways of energy metabolism. They are basically anaerobic, lacking complete Krebs Cycle, and rely on glycolysis.

References 

Larvae